Sir Robert Gordon Cooke (29 May 1930 – 6 January 1987) was a British Conservative Party politician.

Early life
Cooke was born in Cardiff to Walter R. Cooke and Maud Cowie.

Cooke was educated at The Downs School in Wraxall, Somerset, Harrow School and Christ Church, Oxford.

Career
He served as a councillor on Bristol City Council 1954-57 and was a teacher of English at a Bristol public school.

While a councillor and teacher, Cooke contested Bristol South East in 1955.
He was Member of Parliament for Bristol West from a 1957 by-election until 1979. He introduced the Fatal Accidents Act 1959, the direct forerunner to the Fatal Accidents Act 1976 which provides for investigation and compensation in cases of work-related deaths. He was knighted in the 1979 Birthday Honours. Cooke died in January 1987 at the age of 56 of Motor Neurone Disease.

Film location owner
He was the owner of Athelhampton House in Dorset, location of the 1972 film Sleuth, starring Michael Caine and Laurence Olivier, as well as the 1976 Doctor Who serial The Seeds of Doom.

References

External links 
 
Parliamentary Archives, Papers of Sir Robert Cooke  MP, 1930-1987

1930 births
1987 deaths
Conservative Party (UK) MPs for English constituencies
Councillors in South West England
Knights Bachelor
Politicians awarded knighthoods
People educated at Harrow School
Alumni of Christ Church, Oxford
UK MPs 1955–1959
UK MPs 1959–1964
UK MPs 1964–1966
UK MPs 1966–1970
UK MPs 1970–1974
UK MPs 1974
UK MPs 1974–1979